Our Lady of Lourdes Basilica, also known as Poondi Madha Basilica, is a Catholic pilgrimage centre located in Tamil Nadu, South India. It is located in Alamelupuram-Poondi, a small village located adjacent to Thirukattupalli in Thiruvaiyaru taluk of Thanjavur district. The shrine was consecrated as a Minor Basilica in 1999 by Pope John Paul II.

History
In the beginning of the 18th century  a great Italian Jesuit missionary Rev. Fr. Constantine Joseph Beschi S.J. popularly known as "Veeramamuniver" built a church and named it as the church of "Mary Queen of Immaculate Conception". It is in the dome of this church the statue of the miraculous Lady of Poondi is placed. This miraculous statue is one of the three statues that were made in France after the apparition of Our Lady at Lourdes. Rev.Fr.Darres, MEP, brought these statues from France.According to the available records in the Basilica archives the French Missionary Fathers ( MEP Fathers ) were taking care of the Pastoral Mission in Kumbakonam Diocese in the beginning of 20th Century. Fr. Mette Louis Jules started a Catechetical School in Alamelupuram-Poondi around the year 1900 to train Catechists.Rev. Fr. Lourdes Xavier after being appointed as Parish Priest of Alamelupuram-Poondi on 1 September 1955, paid immediate attention to improve the condition of the Church, the central roof of which was in a bad condition and it was feared that it might collapse at any moment causing great damage. So he consulted an engineer. They wanted to demolish only the central roof without any damage to the front elevation, the doom and the altar. Fr.Lourdes Xavier was worried as it would cost too much and it would be beyond his means to find the necessary funds to reconstruct the Church. Fr.Lourdes Xavier, a great devotee of Our Lady, trusted and prayed to Our Lady of Poondi to reveal to him a way out to this problem. Inspired by an inner voice he predicted that the central roof of the church would come down on a particular day and time and it did. This is vividly remembered and described by people even today.

Simon Cardinal Lourdusamy declared the Shrine of our Lady of Poondi as a permanent pilgrimage centre of our Lady of Immaculate Conception. On 03.08.1999, the shrine was declared as Minor Basilica by Pope John Paul II.

Shrine

The present structure of the shrine has a mixture of Gothic and French architectural styles. The facade above the portico has a row of statues of the Twelve Apostles, St. Francis Xavier and Fr. Constantine Joseph Beschi. The church has a relic of the True Cross, believed to be the one on which Christ was crucified.

Gallery

See also

Basilica of Our Lady of Good Health
Our Lady of Snows Basilica
Elakurichi 
Kamanayakkanpatti 
Our Lady of Snow Kallikulam
The Perianayagi Madha Shrine
Villianoor 
Konankuppam

References

Indian Oil Petrol Bunk - Alamelupuram-Poondi Madha Kovil, Thanjavur

Saraswthi Marriage Mahall in Alamelupuram Poondi village near Poondi basilica

External links

 Official website

Shrines to the Virgin Mary
Catholic pilgrimage sites
Roman Catholic churches in Tamil Nadu
Our Lady of Graces
Churches in Thanjavur district
Roman Catholic shrines in India